Centene Stadium may refer to:

Centene Stadium (Great Falls, Montana), the home stadium of the Great Falls Voyagers in Great Falls, Montana
Centene Stadium (St. Louis), the home stadium of St. Louis City SC in St. Louis, Missouri